Acrotome thorncroftii is a species of flowering plant in the family Lamiaceae. It is native to South Mozambique and Africa. It was first published in 1910.

References

Flora of Mozambique
Plants described in 1910
Lamiaceae